Edwin C. Jahn (September 6, 1902 – June 13, 2001) was Dean of the State University of New York College of Environmental Science and Forestry at Syracuse University from 1967 to 1969. He received his B.S. cum laude (1925) and M.S. (1926) from the New York State College of Forestry; and his Ph.D. in Organic Chemistry (1929) from McGill University.

References

External links 
 The archives from Edwin Jahn's tenure as Dean of the New York State College of Forestry are located in the Archives of the SUNY College of Environmental Sciences and Forestry

1902 births
2001 deaths
State University of New York College of Environmental Science and Forestry faculty
State University of New York College of Environmental Science and Forestry alumni
Leaders of the State University of New York College of Environmental Science and Forestry
McGill University Faculty of Science alumni
20th-century American academics